Dan Added (born 13 April 1999) is a French professional tennis player.

Added has a career high ATP singles ranking of No. 270 achieved on 14 November 2022. He also has a career high ATP doubles ranking of No. 122 achieved on 16 January 2023. Added has won 22 ITF titles over the course of his career.

Career

2019–2021: ATP and Grand slam doubles debut 
Added made his ATP main draw doubles debut at the 2019 Moselle Open after receiving a wildcard partnering Albano Olivetti.

Added made his Grand Slam main draw doubles debut at the 2021 French Open also as a wildcard partnering with Jo-Wilfried Tsonga where he recorded his first Major win.

Challenger and World Tour finals

Singles: 12 (7–5)

Doubles: 54 (30–24)

References

External links

1999 births
Living people
French male tennis players
Sportspeople from Strasbourg